Gastroptosis is the abnormal downward displacement of the stomach. It is not a life-threatening condition. The condition frequently causes digestive symptoms and constipation. It is much more prominent in women than men. Gastroptosis is diagnosed with x-ray using barium contrast.

See also
 Visceroptosis

References

External links 

Stomach disorders